Karagaq Sports Hall is a multi–use sports hall in Pejë, Kosovë which is the home of KB Peja and KB Besa.

References

Gjakova